Al-Bayda (also spelled al-Beida) is a village in northwestern Syria, administratively part of the Tartus Governorate, located north of Tartus. Nearby localities include Baniyas to the north, Kharibah to the east and Maten al-Sahel to the south. It is situated just east of the Mediterranean coast. According to the Syria Central Bureau of Statistics, al-Bayda had a population of 5,783 in the 2004 census, making it the second largest locality in the Baniyas nahiyah ("subdistrict") after the city of Baniyas. The inhabitants al-Bayda are predominantly Sunni Muslims with a Christian minority, and together with Baniyas, Basatin al-Assad and Marqab, the villages form a Sunni-inhabited area amid the largely Alawite-inhabited heartland.

During the Syrian civil war, al-Bayda fell under the control of anti-Assad elements. In May 2013 the village was subjected to government bombardment that reportedly left over 100 dead, including the town's mayor and his family. According to main opposition group, a massacre took place on 2 May, committed by government and pro-government forces. "Syrian troops, backed by gunmen from nearby Alawite villages, swept into the village, torched homes and used knives, guns and blunt objects to kill people in the streets."

References

Populated places in Baniyas District